KPSH (90.9 MHz) is an FM radio station licensed to Coachella, California, and serving the Palm Springs radio market. The station is currently owned by Family Worship Center Church, Inc., which is part of Jimmy Swaggart Ministries. KPSH broadcasts a Christian radio format.

Family Worship Center acquired the construction permit for KPSH from Shepherd Communications for $750,000 in 2004; it was targeted to be on the air by January 2005. The station was formerly known as "V-91."

An earlier KPSH was owned and operated by the Palm Springs Unified School District, transmitting from the grounds of the Palm Springs High School at 88.3 FM. That station is now KPSC (88.5).

References

External links
http://www.sonlifetv.com

Gospel radio stations in the United States
PSH
Mass media in Riverside County, California
Coachella, California
Radio stations established in 2005
2005 establishments in California